The Douglas O-43 was a monoplane observation aircraft used by the United States Army Air Corps.

Development
Five Y1O-31A service-test aircraft were ordered in 1931, and delivered to the USAAC in early 1933 designated Y1O-43. They differed from the final configuration of the O-31A, with a wire-braced parasol wing, and a new fin and rudder. An order for 23 O-43A aircraft was completed during 1934, with a deepened fuselage, which eliminated the need for the ventral bulge under the observer's position. Powered by a single 675 hp Curtiss V-1570-59 inline engine, it also had taller vertical surfaces with an inset rudder similar to the O-31A. The canopy was enlarged, and fully enclosed both cockpits. The O-43 and O-43A served with the USSAC observation squadrons for several years before being assigned to National Guard units, such as the 111th Observation Squadron Brownwood Airfield Texas, 15th Observation Squadron Fort Sill Oklahoma, and 3rd Observation Squadron Langley Field Virginia.

The 24th airframe of the O-43A contract was completed as the XO-46 prototype.

Specifications (O-43A)

See also

References

External links

The United States Army Air Forces in World War II
Boeing History
Aerofiles

O-43
Douglas O-43
Single-engined tractor aircraft
Parasol-wing aircraft
Aircraft first flown in 1930